Murder in Oregon constitutes the intentional killing, under circumstances defined by law, of people within or under the jurisdiction of the U.S. state of Oregon.

The United States Centers for Disease Control and Prevention reported that in the year 2020, the state had a murder rate well below the median for the entire country.

Felony murder rule
In the state of Oregon, the common law felony murder rule has been codified in Oregon Revised Statutes § 163.115.

Murder
Under § 163.115, anyone in a group or alone that commits or attempts to commit a predicate felony, and in furtherance of the crime or in the immediate flight therefrom causes the death of a person other than one of the participants is guilty of murder.  The predicate felonies are:
Arson in the first degree
Criminal mischief in the first degree by means of an explosive
Burglary in the first degree
Escape in the first degree
Kidnapping in the first or second degree
Robbery in the first degree
Any felony sexual offense in the first degree
Compelling prostitution
Assault in the first or second degree against a victim younger than 14

Affirmative defenses
§ 163.115(3) provides affirmative defenses to murder under the felony murder rule.  It is an affirmative defense that the defendant:
Was not the only participant in the underlying crime;
Did not commit or solicit the homicidal act; 
Was not armed by a deadly weapon;
Had no reasonable ground to believe that any other participant was armed with a deadly weapon; and
Had no reasonable ground to believe that any other participant intended to engage in conduct likely to result in death.

Penalties

References

Murder in Oregon
Oregon law
U.S. state criminal law